Folo Jan (also Romanized as Folo Jān; also known as Folū Jān) is a village in Khorrami Rural District, in the Central District of Khorrambid County, Fars Province, Iran. At the 2006 census, its population was 9, in 4 families.

References 

Populated places in Khorrambid County